The Belarusian LGBT Human Rights Project GayBelarus is a national youth civic association. They operate the Jáhada (literally Berry) positive queer infoportal (пазітыўны квір. інфапартал).

The association was founded on 18 January 2009 with the goal of providing necessary aid and support for lesbians, gays, bisexuals, and transgender people (hereinafter called LGBT) and their families and friends.

Annually, "GayBelarus" carries out the human rights forum  "Minsk Pride" ,  national LGBT conferences,  regularly reports to international organisations on the state of LGBT issues in Belarus, submits information for the
alternative Universal Periodic Review at UN, and initiates
strategic litigations concerning violation of human rights of LGBT people.

The organization has branches in all regions of the Republic of Belarus: Brest Region, Hrodna Region, Homel Region, Vitebsk Region, Mogilev Region and Minsk Region.

The organization also supports cultural activities, arranges film shows, LGBT party, roundtables to discuss current and strategic issues, and other consolidation activities. In addition, the organization provides legal assistance  and psychological care, for members of the LGBT community.

Purpose

Objectives of "GayBelarus"

 Contribution of the fully LGBT human rights implementation which are provided by law of Republic of Belarus including the international agreements confirmed by Republic of Belarus;
 Homophobia and transphobia level decrease as well as increasing of the tolerance towards the LGBT people;
 Social and psychological support of the LGBT people, members of their families and immediate surrounding.

Activity objects "GayBelarus"
 Human rights work
 Information work
 Social work

History

2009

The Month against Homophobia
One of the first large-scale and public events, initiated by the LGBT Human Rights Project "GayBelarus" in 2009, was the Belarusian campaign against homophobia, inaugurated in Minsk, on 17 April. The campaign involved several events, and the first of these was the premiere of the documentary about LGBT Christians ‘Fish Cannot Fly’, attended by nearly 80 people. The movie was followed by debates on faith, religion, Christianity, Protestantism and fundamental churches.

As a result of the campaign, the Belarusian party "The Greens" (BPG) officially announced the establishment of the Commission on the Lesbian, Gay, Bisexual and Transgender (LGBT) rights. The Greens was the first Belarusian party to have such a commission in their structure. The announcement of the LGBT-subdivision establishment in the party was timed to the campaign "Month against Homophobia in Belarus".

The Belarusian online media highly praised the Belarusian LGBT activists work carried out in the period from 17 April to 17 May within the "Month against Homophobia in Belarus", and called it the second most important cultural project in 2009, which was designed to inform Belarusians about the life and problems of the LGBT community.

Day of Silence
In April 2009, the human rights activists of the LGBT Human Rights Project "GayBelarus", the Belarusian Initiative for Sexual and Gender Equality, with the support of the public association "Young Social Democrats - Young Gramada" held in Minsk a public action Day of Silence, in the form of a "silent" flashmob. With their mouths taped, the participants of the action handed out leaflets with information about what homophobia is and why society needs to deal with this problem.

Not without incident, while handing out the leaflets the flash mob participants were approached by two police officers with a request to show them the flyers. However, looking through the anti-homophobia leaflets for a few minutes, the policemen came to conclusion that the action might be continued but the protesters should peel the tape off their mouths.

5th National Belarusian LGBT Conference
On 26 September in Minsk was held the conference "LGBT - movement and non-governmental institutions. Prospects of cooperation with the NGO sector and the active civil society to overcome homophobia in Belarus". The event was initiated by the LGBT Human Rights Project "GayBelarus" together with the project "GayRussia.Ru". The conference was attended by representatives of some political parties, as well as a wide range of NGOs and civil initiatives, including some anarchists. In total, there were about 100 participants from more than 30 organizations to take part in the event.

Homophobia in Belarus, ways to overcome the problem, the peculiar features of East European LGBT- movement, male and female activists’ interactions and other issues were raised in the various presentations, projects and reports within the conference.

Among the speakers at the conference were the following participants: President of IDAHO – Louis Georges Tin, head of the LGBT Human Rights Project "GayBelarus" - Siarhei Androsenka, head of the project "GayRussiav" - Nikolai Alexeyev, head of the European Commission in Belarus - Jean-Eric Holzapfel, deputy chairman of the Belarusian Helsinki Committee - Tatiana Gotsura, a representative of the Viasna Human Rights Centre - Tatiana Revyaka, head of the Core Values Commission of the Belarusian Social Democratic Party Narodnaya Hramada (BSDP NH) - Igor Borisov, head of the "Greens" - Oleg Novikov, head  of the national NGO "Vstrecha"  ("Meeting") - Oleg Eremin, the First Musical Channel VJ - Katsiaryna Pytleva, head of the portal «Gay.By» - Alexander Polujan.

At the end of the conference, the participants were proposed to vote for a resolution demanding that the President and the Government should amend the Belarusian legislation. The resolution pointed out that Belarus decriminalized homosexuality in 1994, while the World Health Organization removed homosexuality from the list of mental illnesses in 1990.

The participants called on the Belarusian President Alexander Lukashenko, the Government and the Parliament of Belarus to add the concepts of sexual orientation and gender identity to the list of illegal grounds for discrimination, to make amendments to the criminal law in order to legally prohibit incitement to hatred and hostility on grounds of sexual orientation and gender identity, and to equal the human rights of the same-sex and opposite-sex couples.

Also, the conference was attended by several observers - diplomats from Sweden, France and Hungary, as well as a representative of the Swedish human rights organization Civil Rights Defenders.

Action in defense of Iranian gay convicts sentenced to death
On 16 December 2009 in Minsk there was an action organized by the LGBT Human Rights Project "GayBelarus" in defense of the Iranian gay convicts who were sentenced to death for sodomy.

The protest action in the form of picketing took place by the Iranian Embassy and lasted only 15 minutes. Nevertheless, the participants managed to pass their petition directly to the Ambassador of Iran in Belarus. After that, the protestors as well as a reporter for the independent newspaper ‘Nasha Niva’ were detained. After checking the press card and having talks the reporter was released. The human rights activists of the gay movement were drawn up reports for violation of the legal order in regard to arranging or holding meetings, rallies, street processions, demonstrations and other large-scale public actions or picketing.

2010

Monitoring of gay, lesbian, bisexual and transgender discrimination in Belarus in 2007-2009
Monitoring of gay, lesbian, bisexual and transgender people discrimination in Belarus in 2007-2009 was the first special-purpose complex study of the legal state of the Belarusian LGBT community. Monitoring was carried out by the LGBT Human Rights Project "GayBelarus" with the assistance of the "Belarusian Initiative for Sexual and Gender Equality".

The purpose of monitoring was to inform the Belarusian publicity and the international community about the real practices of human rights violation in respect of gays, lesbians and transgender people in Belarus, and to work out recommendations for overcoming the obstacles to the real enjoyment of human rights by Belarusian homosexual and transgender people. The recommendations, developed for the authorities of the Republic of Belarus and Belarusian NGOs, were aimed to suggest the measures to be taken in order to reduce the homophobia level in Belarus as well as to increase the efficiency of state guarantees in respect of the rights and freedoms of all the citizens, regardless their sexual orientation and gender identity.

Gay-lesbian magazine ‘Gay’ presentation
On the night from 27 to 28 February 2010 there was an evening presentation dedicated to the first edition of the new LGBT magazine "GAY: GoodAsYou" in Belarus. The presentation was held in one of the clubs in Minsk and was attended by more than 200 people.

"GAY: GoodaAsYou" was not the first Belarusian LGBT magazine. It aimed to reveal the entire spectrum of gay people's lives, to show the diversity as well as the richness of the Belarusian human rights and cultural gay and lesbian life. At that time the chief editor of the magazine was one of the "GayBelarus" activists Sergei Praded.

LGBT Human Rights Project "GayBelarus" activists’ meeting with the BSU students
On 9 April 2010 the representatives of the LGBT Human Rights Project "GayBelarus" and the organizers of the "Slavic Gay Pride" in Minsk held a meeting with the Belarusian State University students from the Departments of Psychology and Journalism. The meeting was attended by nearly 50 people. Within the event, the participants watched the movie "La mala educación" ("Bad Education") by Pedro Almodóvar. Among the experts at the meeting were the human rights defender Siarhei Androsenka, the culture expert Oleg Grubich and the psychologist Varvara Krasutskaya.

Day of Silence in Minsk
On 25 April 2010 the LGBT Human Rights Project "GayBelarus" activists passed along Nezavisimosti Avenue (Independence Avenue) from the Belarusian State Philharmonic building to Gorky Park (the central children's park), handing out leaflets with information about the dangers of homophobia. The Day of Silence took place simultaneously with the elections to the local councils of the Republic of Belarus, which increased the probability of protesters’ arrests. However, there were no incidents and the participants handed out all the flyers. The whole event lasted 1,5hrs. All along there were no obstacles either from the authorities or any other side.

"Sexual Revolution in Minsk"
On 11 October 2010 in Minsk there was held an action, dedicated to the International Coming-Out Day.  The 10 people, who took part in the event, turned up with rainbow symbols and passed along the central streets of Minsk. Afterwards, one of the participants was detained by the riot police (SWAT) которые прошли с радужной символикой по центральным улицам Минска после чего один из участников был задержан дежурными сотрудниками ОМОНа.  on duty. The arrested activist was fined, retained and had to spend the night in the detention centre in Okrestsin Street in Minsk.

2011

Training workshop and debate club
In February 2011, a training workshop "Citizen and Public Order. Legal and psychological aspects" prepared by GayBelarus as well as a debate club "Gay Pride—pros and cons. Participants of the debates discussed several key topics such as necessity, formats, and possibility to arrange a Gay Pride in Minsk. Besides, the agenda of the debates included a series of questions about the life of gays in Belarus. Also, stereotypes about gay activists within the gay community, the role of activists for the community, and the work that activist do and should do were discussed.

First authorized picket against homophobia
On February 14, 2011, a group of activists of the Belarusian LGBT community held the first authorized anti-homophobia rally in Belarus to support LGBT rights.
Around ten people gathered near the Ministry of Justice of the Republic of Belarus. Due to the cold weather, the event took 10–15 minutes. The participants were holding posters which said  "To love a person you want is a human right," "Equal rights without a compromise," "Homophobia is a disgrace to the country," "Belarus without homophobes," etc. The event was scrutinized by the police and journalists.

East Bloc Love
In March 2011, Logan Mucha, an Australian film director, was shooting a documentary East Bloc Love which featured Human Rights Project "GayBelarus" and Sergey Yenin, a gay activist. The film premiered in 2011 at the Frameline LGBT Film Festival in San Francisco, and later it was screened at a number of other film festivals such as Movies That Matter, Amnesty International, and it won the nomination "Best Documentary" at the Merlinka Film Festival [53] in Belgrade.

Film screenings in Vitebsk
Since April 2011, regular LGBT film screenings in Vitebsk were arranged by a GayBelarus coordinator of the Vitebsk Region[54]. Subsequently, the coordinator was subjected to pressure by the local authorities. He was charged with organizing of the so-called silent protests in Vitebsk, which was one of the reasons why he had to stop his weekly film screenings.

Information campaign in support of LGBT
On May 17, activists from the LGBT Human Rights Group "GayBelarus" and the MSA "Young social democrats—Maladaya Hramada" intended to hold an information event where they wanted to disseminate leaflets about legalizing gay love in Belarus.

The event was to begin near the House of Officers close to the Executive Office of the President of the Republic of Belarus—a traditional meeting point for gays and lesbians in Minsk. As the group of young people gathered and went towards the Nezalezhnasti Ave., it was surrounded by the police officers in civilian clothes, special forces were called for who, having arrived 2–3 minutes later, detained 15 people. After two–two and a half hours, all detainees were freed without drawing any reports. Four complaints about the police officers’ actions were made by the detainees including one regarding the unlawful taking of personal belongings.

GayBelarus Foundation Meeting
(The first attempt to get registered)
On October 15, members of the LGBT Human Rights Group "GayBelarus" held the foundation meeting in Minsk and signed the charter  of their human rights organization, chose its chair, counselors, and members of the utilization review committee. Since words "Belarus" or "Belarusian" can’t be used in the name of the organization unless legally endorsed, the name was decided to be "Human Rights Centre Alternative Plus".

In late December, the registration was rejected due to formal reasons. The letter from the Ministry of Justice stated that the founders of the organization had provided a wrong date of birth of one of the 61 founders and made a spelling mistake in the name of another founder. This inconsistency was later reflected in the monitoring of the legal status of the Belarusian nongovernmental organizations.

Other activities in brief
 In June, the ban to hold a Slavic Gay Pride 2010 was appealed in the Supreme Court of the Republic of Belarus; moreover, Slavic Pride course of events was reflected in the report about Belarus--"Human rights in today’s world," which was prepared by the Amnesty International.
 In September–October, regional offices of the LGBT Human Rights Group "GayBelarus" were opened in Brest, Grodno, Gomel, and Vitebsk.
 In October, action game "Searching for tolerance" was held; it was arranged by GayBelarus together with the Union of the Belarusian Students.

2012

International Week of Actions against Racism and Xenophobia
On 17 March  2012, the human rights activists of "GayBelarus" held an action in the centre of Minsk. The action was dedicated to the International Day for the Elimination of Racial Discrimination. About 10 activists were handing out stickers and information materials against racism, xenophobia and the death penalty.

At the end of the sprint flash mob, right before disappearing the participants left two toys and a bag with some glued on stickers against racism, xenophobia and the death penalty. The reason for this rapidity of the action as well as the poor format was the fact that the Minsk local authorities once again banned a peaceful LGBT campaign. The very action was timed to coincide with the European Week against Racism and Xenophobia, as well as the International Day for the Elimination of Racial Discrimination.

In addition to the public action and within the European Week against Racism and Xenophobia, the human rights activists of ‘GayBelarus’ handed out leaflets in the subway, arranged a film screening and debates on the death penalty.

Rainbow column on "Free Will Day" and the Chernobyl Path
On 25 March 2012, 15 human rights activists of ‘GayBelarus’ appeared with rainbow flags, the world’s symbol of the movement for the rights of the LGBT community, at the procession of the Belarusian democratic opposition in Minsk, dedicated to the Free Will Day. The organizers did not hamper the LGBT column procession.

Later, on 26 April 2012, the activists of the human rights project took part in the annual procession of the Belarusian opposition – the Chernobyl Path. The LGBT activists were holding rainbow flags and passing along with the rest of the participants. However, there was an incident when a young man tried to pull out two rainbow flags out of the gay activists’ hands. Later on, the Orthodox media tried to blacken the event due to the fact that gay activists took part in the action.

The Month Against Homophobia and Transphobia
May 2012 was the month against homophobia and transphobia. During the period were held several major events, including the round table ‘LGBT and Education’ and a number of film screenings. In addition, the project activists pasted up stickers calling for tolerance. Minsk City Executive Committee did not allow conducting any public actions in support of tolerant attitude to the LGBT community. [83] Nevertheless, the human rights activists of ‘GayBelarus’ together with the Society of Belarusian Students held a public action in Minsk. During the event the participants were handing out cards with information on equality and diversity of Belarusian society.

Founding Congress "GayBelarus"
(second attempt of registration)
On 8 December 2012 in Minsk was held the founding congress of the National Youth Public Association ‘Human Rights Center ‘Lambda’.  This was the name, under which the human rights project ‘GayBelarus’ wanted to legalize their activities in 2012. Sergey Androsenko was elected President and Maxim Dmitriev - his deputy.

The congress was attended by 72 delegates from all the regions of the Republic of Belarus and Minsk. They adopted the articles of the association and elected its governing bodies. The organization mainly aimed at providing various kinds of legal assistance for lesbians, gays, bisexuals and transgender people. Subsequently, an application was filed to the Ministry of Justice with a request to register the organization.

Other activities in brief
 At the beginning of the year the "GayBelarus" activists delivered a lecture on the Belarusian LGBT movement to the students-politologists of the Dutch University of Radboud. The lecturers told about their activities, shared their experience in regards to the organization of some events, and told about the problems homosexuals encounter in Belarus.
 10 activists of the human rights project "GayBelarus" took part in "KyivPride2012".
 2 activists of the human rights project "GayBelarus" took part in the Baltic Pride.
 20 activists of the human rights project "GayBelarus" together with the members of other Belarusian organizations took part in the Parade of Equality in Warsaw.
 At the end of July 2013 a Minsk-Brest cycling race was held. The event was arranged in support of the Minsk Gay Pride 2012. All along the route the participants were distributing flyers about Minsk Gay Pride, thereby informing about the upcoming event.
 Also, in 2012 the human rights project "GayBelarus" held several other cultural, educational and other events.
 From November 2012 the human rights project "GayBelarus" started film screenings at their headquarters. The film screenings took place every week and the movies selected were related to the LGBT issues.  Everyone could attend the event, regardless of sexual orientation and gender identity.

2013
On 5 February 2013 the Ministry of Justice made the decision to refuse the registration of the National Youth Public Association ‘Human Rights Center ‘Lambda’. The Ministry of Justice stated that the articles of the organization do not have any provisions that the statutory activities of the public association would be aimed at ensuring social formation and the all-round development of young people. The Ministry of Justice reported that all the organizational faults during the application procedure are irremediable.

The founders of 'Lambda' appealed against the decision of the Ministry of Justice to the Supreme Court of the Republic of Belarus. During the hearing the applicant's claim was adjudicated. The founders of the National Youth Public Association ‘Human Rights Center ‘Lambda’ made the decision to file a complaint to the UN Committee on Human Rights.

As a result of this attempt to register the public organization, in January and February 2013 more than 60 founders of ‘Lambda’ in no less than 10 cities across the country were called in for a ‘conversation’ by the representatives of the Office on Drugs and Trafficking Control of the Ministry of Internal Affairs of the Republic of Belarus. The police officers asked questions related to the founders’ private lives, including their sexual roles and sexual orientation, as well as the organization's activities and the personality of its leader. In case of refusal to come to the office for a ‘conversation’ without any formal notice, the police officers paid visits to the working places of the people or got in touch with the universities’ authorities with a request to conduct a preventive conversation with the student.

The leaders of the organization were also under pressure. So the head of the organization had his passport taken away twice on the grounds of spotting the document among those reported lost. The activists were also removed from the trains, unreasonably searched and put under lots of psychological stress.

One of the activists was severely beaten at the police precinct. Consequently, followed a formal complaint filed to the prosecutor’s office.

Amnesty International called on the Belarusian Government to respect the right for freedom of LGBT associations and give them the opportunity to register the ‘Human Rights Center ‘Lambda’. The numerous facts related to the persecution of LGBT representatives, as well as their organizations and activists, by the authorities were included in the report on the human rights situation in Belarus regarding the rights for freedom of peaceful assembly and freedom of association. The report was published by Amnesty International in 2013. The cases of persecution and intimidation were also stated by Ian Kelly, the chairman of the U.S. Mission to the OSCE, in his report ‘Statement of harassment in regards to the LGBT people and political prisoners in Belarus’ to the Permanent Council in Vienna on 14 February 2013.

Within the period from January to April 2013 there were 7 police raids committed on the activities of the human rights project ‘GayBelarus’ and the parties of the LGBT community. The first incident occurred on the night from 11 to 12 January in the Minsk club ‘6_A’. The police entered the club, blocked the way out and copied the personal data of all the visitors. According to the witnesses, there were about 100 people at the club at the time of the raid. In the night from 12 to 13 January a similar case occurred in the Vitebsk club ‘XXI Century’. At around 1 a.m. the police broke into the club and immediately ordered everyone to stand against the walls: the males – on one side, the females – on the other side. The police officers copied all the personal data of the visitors, asking them for their names, place of residence and employment. All the visitors were also filmed on camera. Some of the detainees during the police raids in Vitebsk filed complaints with the city executive committees on the illegal actions of the police.

Similar raids took place throughout the following 4 months. Consequently, the owner of the club ‘6_A’ started having problems with the city authorities, which finally made him hurriedly and unexpectedly close down the club.

In April, the human rights activists of "GayBelarus" filed an application for holding a picket at the Embassy of France in favour of the gay marriage legalization in this country, but the Minsk City Executive Committee did not allow conducting a peaceful action by the LGBT representatives.

In 2013, "GayBelarus" actively promoted the protection of the attacked LGBT representative Vitaly Gulyak whose case had already been filed to the prosecutor’s office. Vitaly was persecuted by an organized group of ‘hunters of pedophiles’ called ‘Leather Microphone’. Subsequently, two of the hunters were sentenced for insulting and distribution of the victim’s personal information, two more were announced wanted by the Criminal Investigation Department.

"GayBelarus" together with the other LGBT initiatives in Belarus collectively condemned the statements by the Ambassador of France to Belarus Michel Raineri in which he stated that ‘as a functionary he is for the same-sex marriage, but as a true believer he speaks in favour of the union of a man and a woman. Consequently, a joint letter was sent to a number of the government agencies of the French Republic with the request to admit the inadmissibility of such statements from the sidelines of diplomats as this discriminates against LGBT rights. After that, on the initiative of the Ambassador Michel Raineri, a meeting was held in the Embassy of France. The meeting was attended by the representatives of the human rights project ‘GayBelarus’ Natalia Mankovskaya and the project ‘Gay Alliance of Belarus’ Alexander Poluian.

In 2013, the delegation of the human rights project "GayBelarus" also took part in the "KyivPride2013".

Present
Many members of the association have been forced to flee the country because of persecution of gays from the state.

Partners 
In Belarus:
 The Human Rights Center "Viasna"
 Belarusian Helsinki Committee
 The Justice Initiative
 Young Social Democrats - Young Gromada
 Belarusian Party "Greens"
 Belarusian Students Association
 Trade union group "Student Council"
 Public Initiative "project on gender education" Step to Equality"
 Cultural Initiative "НОС"
 Republican Youth Public Association "Meeting"
 Youth Public Association "NEXT STOP - New Life"
 Belarus Free Theatre

In the world:
 The Polish Campaign Against Homophobia
 Lithuanian Gay League
 "Mozaika"
 Russian internet radio "Indigo"
 Gay Alliance Ukraine
 The Russian project "Men Plus"
 International Youth Human Rights Movement
 LGBT organization of St. Petersburg "Exit"
 Montenegrin LGBT organization "Forum Progress"
 Civil Rights Defenders (Sweden)
 Czech LGBT organization "PROUD"
 organization "Tupilak" (Sweden)

Membership 

 A member of the International association of gay-pride organizers  InterPride
 A member of the European association of gay-pride organizers EuroPride
 A representative and an organizer of Slavic gay-pride in Belarus and a co-organizer of Slavic Pride in Moscow. Organisator of the Slavic Pride in Moscow is the advocate group LGBT Human Rights Project Gayrussia.ru.
 An official coordinator of International day against homophobia in Belarus and a member of International Day Against Homophobia and Transphobia Committee
 A co-organizer of a Month against homophobia in April/May 2008 in Belarus, which was not given authorization. Space for the event was provided, but only on condition that the names of organizations providing space remain in uncertainty. Democratic parties and politicians did not support this event.

See also
 Official site of LGBT Human Rights Project "GayBelarus"  
 LGBT Human Rights Project «GayBelarus» in Facebook 

 Minsk Pride
 LGBT rights in Belarus
 Human rights in Belarus
 LGBT Human Rights Project Gayrussia.ru

References

External links
 Official website 
 LGBT Human Rights Project GayRussia.Ru (en)(ru)— Official site
 Belarusian portal of gays, lesbians, bisexuals and transsexuals (en)(ru)(by)
 belarusian initiative by sexual and gender equality (en)(ru)
 Homepage of Pride news (en)(ru)(by)
 Video: Promotion Video gaybelarus.by on YouTube
 Video: Interview with Gay Rights activist Serguei Androsenko on YouTube
 Video: rainbow flag (LGBT movement) at the march for the Chernobyl Victims in Minsk on YouTube

LGBT political advocacy groups in Belarus
2009 establishments in Belarus